The Peña Capeña is a French aerobatic amateur-built aircraft that was designed by competitive aerobatic pilot Louis Peña of Dax, Landes and made available in the form of plans for amateur construction.

Design and development
The Capeña features a cantilever low-wing, a single seat enclosed cockpit under a bubble canopy, fixed conventional landing gear and a single engine in tractor configuration.

The Capeña is made from wood. The standard recommended engines is the  Lycoming AEIO-360 four-stroke powerplant.

The aircraft was later developed into the two seat Peña Bilouis.

Specifications (Capeña)

References

External links

Homebuilt aircraft
Single-engined tractor aircraft
Aerobatic aircraft